The Palm m500 series of handheld personal digital assistants consisted of three devices: the Palm m500, Palm m505, and Palm m515. The series was a follow-up to the popular Palm V series with a similar, though slightly shorter, footprint and form factor.

Like the Palm V, the series had metal cases (although the m500 had a plastic back plate) and a 160x160 resolution screen. The distinguishing features common to all in the series are a SD/MMC expansion slot, faster processor, new faster USB sync interface, new software functionality, new vibrating alarms, new indicator light, and a mechanical fastener vs. hot-glue case construction. Later models introduced an improved version of the color display and more memory.

Palm m500 series

The Palm m500 series of Palm Pilot PDAs was released on March 6, 2001. Based on a poll conducted by Palm Computing (formerly a division of 3Com), it was determined that the Palm V had the "definitive look" of the ideal PDA.

Common traits
All of the Palm m500 models were based on the Palm V form factor. They had the same slim case with the slight curvature to its left and right edges. The power button lit up green when in its docking cradle or when an important message was available. Input included four programmable buttons, two scrolling buttons, and a touch-sensitive 2-1/4" x 3" screen (including the 2-1/4" x 3/4" input area). As with most other Palm devices, data was input with a stylus pen using a Graffiti method.

Each of the m500 series models featured a Secure Digital (SD) or Multi Media Card (MMC) expansion slot. The SD/MMC slot allowed for additional memory upgrades for the devices, as well an expandable platform for add-on devices. The m500 series was also the first of Palm's devices to incorporate the new Universal Connector, which was only "universal" until the Palm T3 after which it was abandoned. It allowed for additional add-on devices and common HotSync cradles.

Palm m500
The m500 was the entry-level model of the m500 series. With 8 MB of on-board memory, it featured a monochrome screen and all of the features common to the m500 series devices. It was released on March 6, 2001, as part of the original rollout for the series.

Details
Operating System: Palm OS version 4.0 (upgrade to 4.1)
Processor: 33 MHz Motorola Dragonball VZ
Memory: 8 MB
Display: 160x160 pixel B&W display, 4-bit (16 shades of gray)
Size: 4.49 x 3.02 x .46 in. (11.41 x 7.67 x 1.17 cm)
Weight: 
Battery: Internal Lithium Polymer Rechargeable; 2hr recharge time when empty
AC Adapter: Input: 120 V 60 Hz 10 W, Output: 5.0 VDC 1.0 A
IrDA port
Expansion Slot compatible with SD and MMC cards

Palm m505
The m505 was, at the time of the series rollout, the top-of-the-line model of all Palm devices. It also had 8 MB of on-board memory. In addition to standard m500 series features, it also featured a 16-bit color frontlit screen. It was released on March 6, 2001, as part of the original rollout for the series.

Details
Operating System: Palm OS version 4.0 (upgrade to 4.1)
Processor: 33 MHz Motorola Dragonball VZ
Memory: 8 MB (4MB Flash + 8MB RAM)
Display: 160x160 pixel color display (65,000+ colors)
Size: 4.48 x 3.03 x 0.50 in. (11.38 x 7.70 x 1.27 cm)
Weight: 
Battery: Internal Lithium Polymer Rechargeable; 2hr recharge time when empty
AC Adapter: Input: 120VAC 60 Hz 11W, Output: 5.0VDC 1.0A
IrDA port
Expansion Slot compatible with SD and MMC cards

Palm m515

On March 4, 2002, Palm released the m515. Based on consumer reviews and surveys conducted by the company, the m515 was developed as an improved version of, and replacement for, the m505. Notable enhancements include 16 MB of on-board memory and an enhanced backlighting system. There was much criticism about the m505 that, even with the backlight on, it was dim and difficult to read in some environments. The m515 added an additional setting allowing the backlight to be put on "high", which was considerably brighter than its predecessor.

Details
Operating System: Palm OS version 4.1
Processor: 33 MHz Motorola Dragonball VZ
Memory: 16 MB RAM + 4 MB Flash
Display: 160x160 pixel color display (65,000+ colors)
Size: 4.48 x 3.03 x 0.50 in. (11.38 x 7.70 x 1.27 cm)
Weight: 
Battery: Internal Lithium Polymer Rechargeable
AC Adapter: Input: 120VAC 60 Hz 11W, Output: 5.0VDC 1.0A
IrDA port
Expansion Slot compatible with SD and MMC cards

References
 New Sleek Palm m500 and m505 Handhelds Add Expansion, Mobile Connectivity and Vibrant Color, Palm Press Release, March 19, 2001
 New Palm m130 and m515 Handhelds Add Spring Color to 2002 Product Lineup, March 4, 2002
Niles, Steve, "Why the Palm m500 Series is Ideal for the Enterprise", September, 2002. PalmPower Magazine Enterprise Edition, Issue 2002–09.
"Palm m515 Comparison Pictures" 2 March 2002.  Palm Infocenter.

See also
Palm (PDA)
Palm OS
PalmSource, Inc.
Palm, Inc.
Graffiti (Palm OS)

Palm OS devices
68k-based mobile devices